Liam John Edwards (born 2 October 1996) is an English professional footballer who plays as a defender for Chester.

Career 
Edwards started his career in Stoke City's academy, and signed his first professional contract with them in 2015. He played no matches for the first team however, and was released in 2017. After his release, he signed for Bolton Wanderers and became captain of their U23 team. As captain, he led them to win the 2017–18 Professional Development League title.

In November 2018, Edwards signed on loan for Southport. His loan was extended to the end of the season in January 2019. He helped Southport win two trophies, the 2018–2019 Lancashire FA Challenge Trophy and Liverpool Senior Cup.

On 3 August 2019, he made his first appearance for Bolton's first team, playing the full 90 minutes of a 2–0 away defeat to Wycombe Wanderers. On 12 September 2019, he signed a new contract at Bolton until 2022. On 27 February 2020 he was ruled out for the rest of the season with injury. The injury also caused him to miss the entire 2020–2021 season as well. He finally returned from injury after 22 months out of action when he played 45 minutes for Bolton's Reserve team in a 3–0 defeat against Preston North End's reserves on 26 October 2021. A week later he made his competitive return, coming on as a late substitute in a 3–0 against Rochdale in the EFL Trophy. On 12 November 2021 Edwards re-joined Southport on an initial month's loan in order to build up match fitness having missed nearly two years of football. He made his second debut for them a day later when he started in a 4–1 against Boston United. On 13 December, the loan was extended for another month and then was extended again until the end of the season on 9 January 2022. On 3 May 2022, Bolton confirmed that he would be released at the end of his contract. After his release, he signed for Chester.

Personal life
During his 23 month injury between January 2020 and November 2021, Edwards studied for a degree in chartered physiology just in case he would never be able to play again.

Career statistics

Notes

Honours
Bolton Wanderers Reserves
Professional Development League: 2017–18

Southport
Lancashire FA Challenge Trophy: 2018–19
Liverpool Senior Cup: 2018–19

References

1996 births
Living people
English footballers
Association football defenders
Stoke City F.C. players
Bolton Wanderers F.C. players
Southport F.C. players
English Football League players